MPSA may refer to:

Malta Pharmaceutical Students' Association
Mobile Payment Services Association
Midwest Political Science Association
Mississippi Private School Association, previous name of the Mississippi Association of Independent Schools
Ruben Cantu Airport, the ICAO code for the airport in Panama
Metropolitan Police's Sikh Association